Schimek is the Germanized spelling of a Slavic pet form of the personal name Simon. It may refer to:

 Alfred F. Schimek (1897-1980), American architect
 DiAnna Schimek (born 1940), American politician  
 Otto Schimek (1925–1944), Austrian soldier during World War II
 Schimeck Family, a 1915 play by Gustav Kadelburg
 The Schimeck Family, a 1926 German silent film based on the play
 , a 1957 film based on the Gustav Kadelburg play

See also
 Simek (disambiguation), a similar name derived from the same origin
 Shimek (disambiguation), a similar name derived from the same origin